Jonas De Roeck (born 20 December 1979) is a Belgian professional football coach and former player who is the manager of Belgian First Division A club Westerlo.

Early life
De Roeck was born in Barcelona, Spain, where his father was working as a chemical engineer at the time. As a child he also lived in the United States and England.

Playing career
De Roeck started his professional career with Antwerp in 1999 and spent several seasons with other Belgian clubs such as Lierse, Germinal Beerschot and Gent before moving to Germany with FC Augsburg. He returned in the summer of 2012 when he signed with Oud-Heverlee Leuven, where he stayed for one season before moving back to Antwerp.

Managerial career
On 27 May 2021, De Roeck was officially announced as the new head coach of Belgian First Division B club Westerlo. He became the successor of Bob Peeters, who had not managed to lead the club to promotion to the top division in the four previous seasons. Westerlo earned promotion to the Belgian First Division A in his first season at the helm. After the 2021-22 season, De Roeck signed a contract extension to keep him at the club through the 2024-25 season.

References

External links
 
 
 
 Jonas De Roeck at Footballdatabase

1979 births
Living people
Association football defenders
Belgian footballers
Belgian expatriate footballers
Cobham F.C. players
Royal Antwerp F.C. players
Lierse S.K. players
Beerschot A.C. players
K.A.A. Gent players
FC Augsburg players
Oud-Heverlee Leuven players
Sint-Truidense V.V. managers
R.S.C. Anderlecht managers
K.V.C. Westerlo managers
Belgian Pro League players
Challenger Pro League players
Bundesliga players
2. Bundesliga players
Expatriate footballers in Germany
Belgium under-21 international footballers
Belgian football managers
Belgian First Division B managers
Footballers from Barcelona